Gillis Smak Gregoor (1770 – 1843), was a Dutch landscape painter.

Biography
He was born in Dordrecht, South Holland and was a pupil of Abraham and Jacob van Strij. He is known for landscapes with animals and was a member of the Pictura painter's collective in Dordrecht. His pupil was Matthijs Quispel.
He died in Dordrecht.

References

Gillis Smak Gregoor on Artnet

1770 births
1843 deaths
Dutch painters
Dutch male painters
Artists from Dordrecht
Painters from Dordrecht